Volgograd State Medical University is located in Volgograd which is situated in the southern part of Russia on the west bank of the Volga River. It started as Stalingrad Medical Institute founded in 1935. In 1993 it received the status of the Academy, and in 2003 it was granted the status of the University. It is currently headed by the prominent Russian scientist, Academician of the Russian Academy for Medical Sciences, Professor Vladimir I. Petrov.

The University is accredited by the Russian Ministry for Education for the teaching of both Russian and overseas students.  Since 2000 the Volgograd State Medical University has got an opportunity to teach foreign students in the English language.

Colleges and Departments of the university 

 College of General Medicine
 College of Dentistry and MD
 College of Pediatrics
 College of Pharmacy
 College of Medical Biochemistry
 College of Social Work and Clinical Psychology
 Department for International Students
 College for Postgraduate and Continuous Education
 Department for Foundation Courses

In Pyatigorsk there is the branch of VSMU — the Pyatigorsk Medical and Pharmaceutical Institute.

Teaching 

The College of General Medicine and the College of Dentistry has been a hot favorite for most of the foreign students in recent times. They can opt to be trained either in English or Russian medium. Undergraduate teaching is centered upon theoretical (lectures) and practical classes.

Postgraduate training is provided by different colleges of the University; it is available in the following areas: Allergology and Immunology, Cardiology, Clinical Pharmacology, Endocrinology, Family Medicine, Gastroenterology, Gynecology and Obstetrics, Infectious Diseases, Maxillofacial Surgery, Neurology, Oncology, Surgical Dentistry, Ophthalmology, Orthodontics, Otolaryngology, Pathological Anatomy, Paediatrics, Phthisiology, Preventive Dentistry, Prosthodontics, Psychiatry, Pulmonology, Radiotherapy, Dermatology, ST Diseases, Social Hygiene and Public Health, Sports Medicine and Occupational Medicine, Pedodontics, Surgery of Children, Surgery, Therapy (Internal Medicine), Traumatology and Orthopaedics, Urology. There are 4 varieties of post-diploma training: Internship, Residency, and Postgraduate training for Ph.D. The course of studies at the Internship is for 1 year. After graduation the Specialization Certificate is provided. The course of studies at the Residency is 2 years. After graduation the Specialist Certificate is provided. The course of studies at the Ph.D. is from 3 to 5 years. Following the thesis completion the scientific degree Ph.D. (Medicine) is granted.

Facilities

University campus 

The pre-clinical courses are provided at the 4 main buildings of the university while the clinical courses are provided at 15 multi-profile clinics equipped with up-to-date facilities.

Accommodation 

The University provides 3 hostels with most of the facilities for students.

Sports, Social and Cultural facilities 

The university has a department for physical training. It includes a gym, sports ground and an indoor mini stadium. The many theatres, cinemas, concert halls and museums located in the city make it possible for the international students to learn and enjoy the Russian culture.

Student welfare 

The University has a special Department for International students which is in charge of the welfare of the international students, their academics and everyday activities.

Other activities 

Every semester the university sets aside a day for academically excellent students and such students receive a certificate of excellence from the Dean for International students.

References

External links 

 University website 
 Students forum (in Russian) 
 European universities

1935 establishments in Russia
Educational institutions established in 1935
Medical schools in Russia
Recipients of the Order of the Red Banner of Labour
Volgograd